Melanchthon, Melancthon or Melancton may refer to:

Surname 
 Philip Melanchthon (1497–1560), German Lutheran reformer, collaborator with Martin Luther
 G. D. Melanchthon (1934–1994), Indian theologian

Given name 
 Melancthon J. Briggs (1846–1923), American politician
 Melancthon Williams Jacobus Jr. (1855–1937), American theologian
 Melancton Smith (1744–1798), American delegate to the Continental Congress and merchant
 Melancton Smith (1810–1893), US Navy rear admiral
 Melancthon Smith (Confederate officer) (1829–1881), American Civil War Confederate colonel
 Melancthon S. Wade (1802–1868), American businessman, horticulturist and Civil War Union Army general
 Melancthon Brooks Woolsey (1817–1874), US Navy commodore

Masculine given names